John D. Heywood was a photographer in 19th-century United States. He worked in Boston, Massachusetts, c.1856–1862. Examples of his photographs reside in the New York Public Library;Historic New England; and the Massachusetts Historical Society.

References

External links
 Library of Congress: Portrait from: J. D. Heywood's Photographic Art Rooms, New Berne, N.C.
 Library of Congress: Civil War photograph by Heywood.

Year of birth missing
Year of death missing
Photographers from Massachusetts
Artists from Boston
19th century in Boston
19th-century American photographers